A presidential system, or single executive system, is a form of government in which a head of government, typically with the title of president, leads an executive branch that is separate from the legislative branch in systems that use separation of powers. This head of government is in most cases also the head of state. In a presidential system, the head of government is directly or indirectly elected by a group of citizens and is not responsible to the legislature, and the legislature cannot dismiss the president except in extraordinary cases. A presidential system contrasts with a parliamentary system, where the head of government comes to power by gaining the confidence of an elected legislature.

Not all presidential systems use the title of president. Likewise, the title is sometimes used by other systems. It originated from a time when such a person personally presided over the governing body, as with the President of the Continental Congress in the early United States, prior to the executive function being split into a separate branch of government. It may also be used by presidents in semi-presidential systems. Heads of state of parliamentary republics, largely ceremonial in most cases, are called presidents. Dictators or leaders of one-party states, whether popularly elected or not, are also often called presidents.

The presidential system is the dominant form of government in the mainland Americas, with 18 of its 22 sovereign states being presidential republics, the exceptions being Canada, Belize, Guyana and Suriname. It is also prevalent in Central and southern West Africa and in Central Asia. By contrast, there are very few presidential republics in Europe, with Belarus, Cyprus, and Turkey being the only examples.

History

Development in the Americas 
The presidential system has its roots in the governance of the British colonies of the 17th century in what is now the United States. The Pilgrims, permitted to govern themselves in Plymouth Colony, established a system that utilized an independent executive branch. Each year, a governor was chosen by the colonial legislature, as well as several assistants, analogous to modern day cabinets. Additional executive officials such as constables and messengers were then appointed. At the same time, the British Isles underwent a brief period of republicanism as The Protectorate, during which the Lord Protector served as an executive leader similar to a president.

The first true presidential system was developed during the United States Constitutional Convention in 1787. Drawing inspiration from the previous colonial governments, from English Common Law, and from philosophers such as John Locke and Montesquieu, the delegates developed what is now known as the presidential system. Most notably, James Wilson advocated for a unitary executive figure that would become the role of the president. The United States became the first presidential republic when the Constitution of the United States came into force in 1789, and George Washington became the first president under a presidential system.

During the 1810s and 1820s, Spanish colonies in the Americas sought independence, and several new Spanish-speaking governments emerged in Latin America. These countries modeled their constitutions after that of the United States, and the presidential system became the dominant political system in the Americas. Following several decades of monarchy, Brazil also adopted the presidential system in 1889. Latin American presidential systems have experienced varying levels of stability, with many experiencing periods of dictatorial rule.

As a global system 
Following the pattern of other Spanish colonies, the Philippines established the first presidential system in Asia in 1898, but it fell under American control due to the Spanish–American War. The presidential system was restored after the United States granted the Philippines independence in 1946.

The end of World War II established presidential systems in two countries. After the United States ended the Japanese occupation of Korea, it assisted South Korea in the formation of a presidential government. However, the early years of the South Korean presidency were marked by dictatorial control. At the same time, Indonesia declared independence from the Netherlands in 1945. While it nominally used a presidential system, it was in effect a dictatorship where the president controlled all branches of government. A true presidential system was established in 1998.

Decolonization in the 1950s and 1960s brought with it significant expansion of the presidential system. During this time, several new presidential republics were formed in Africa. Cyprus, the Maldives, and South Vietnam also adopted the presidential system following decolonization. Pakistan and Bangladesh did so as well, but they changed their governmental systems shortly afterward.

Several more countries adopted the presidential system in the final decades of the 20th century. A modified version of the presidential system was implemented in Iran following constitutional reform in 1989 in which the Supreme Leader serves as the head of state and is the absolute power in this country. In 1981, Palau achieved independence and adopted a presidential system. When the Soviet Union was dissolved in 1991, the presidential system was adopted by the new states that were created, though most of them adopted other governmental systems over the following decades. Belarus nominally maintains a presidential system, but critics allege that it has been transformed into a dictatorship. The countries of Central Asia are also described as using the presidential system.

The presidential system continues to be adopted in the 21st century. Following its independence in 2011, South Sudan adopted a presidential system. In 2018, Turkey abolished its parliamentary system in favor of a presidential system, which was criticized as an attempt by Recep Tayyip Erdoğan to consolidate power.

Characteristics 
There are several characteristics that are unique to presidential systems or prominent in countries that use presidential systems. The defining aspect of presidential systems is the separation of powers that divides the executive and the legislature. Advocates of presidential systems cite the democratic nature of presidential elections, the advantages of separation of powers, the efficiency of a unitary executive, and the stability provided by fixed-terms. Opponents of presidential systems cite the potential for gridlock, the difficulty of changing leadership, and concerns that a unitary executive can give way to a dictatorship.

Separation of powers 

The presidential system is defined by the separation of the executive branch from other aspects of government. The head of government is elected to work alongside, but not as a part of, the legislature. There are several types of powers that are traditionally delegated to the president. Under a presidential system, the president may have the power to challenge legislation through a veto, the power to pardon crimes, authority over foreign policy, authority to command the military as the Commander-in-chief, and authority over advisors and employees of the executive branch.

Checks and balances 
Separation of powers is sometimes held up as an advantage, in that each branch may scrutinize the actions of the other. This is in contrast with a parliamentary system, where legislature that also serves as the executive won't scrutinize its own actions. Writing about the Watergate scandal, former British MP Woodrow Wyatt said "don't think a Watergate couldn't happen here, you just wouldn't hear about it." The extent of this effect is debated. Some commentators argue that the effect is mitigated when the president's party is in power, while others note that party discipline is not as strictly enforced in presidential systems.

Another stated benefit of the separation of powers is the ability of the legislature to enforce limits on the powers of the executive. In a parliamentary system, if important legislation proposed by the incumbent prime minister and his cabinet is "voted down" by a majority of the members of parliament then it is considered a vote of no confidence. Given the severe consequences of a no confidence vote, the executive has wide latitude to act without restraint and exercise control over the legislature. The presidential system has no such mechanism, and the legislature has little incentive to appease the president beyond saving face.

Efficiencies and inefficiencies 
When an action is within the scope of a president's power, a presidential system can respond more rapidly to emerging situations than parliamentary ones. A prime minister, when taking action, needs to retain the support of the legislature, but a president is often less constrained. In Why England Slept, future U.S. president John F. Kennedy argued that British prime ministers Stanley Baldwin and Neville Chamberlain were constrained by the need to maintain the confidence of the Commons.

Conversely, a presidential system can produce gridlock when the president and the legislature are in opposition. This is rarely a problem in a parliamentary system, as the prime minister is always a member of the party in power. This gridlock is common occurrence, as the electorate often expects more rapid results than are possible from new policies and switches to a different party at the next election. Critics such as Juan Linz, argue that in such cases of gridlock, presidential systems don't offer voters the kind of accountability seen in parliamentary systems, and that this inherent political instability can cause democracies to fail, as seen in such cases as Brazil and Allende's Chile.

It is easy for either the president or the legislature to escape blame by shifting it to the other. Describing the United States, former Treasury Secretary C. Douglas Dillon said "the president blames Congress, the Congress blames the president, and the public remains confused and disgusted with government in Washington". Years before becoming president, Woodrow Wilson famously wrote "how is the schoolmaster, the nation, to know which boy needs the whipping?" Walter Bagehot said of the American system, "the executive is crippled by not getting the law it needs, and the legislature is spoiled by having to act without responsibility: the executive becomes unfit for its name, since it cannot execute what it decides on; the legislature is demoralized by liberty, by taking decisions of others [and not itself] will suffer the effects".

However, this gridlock is also sometimes touted as a benefit. Divided government, where the presidency and the legislature are controlled by different parties, is said to restrain the excesses of both the coalition and opposition, and guarantee cross-partisan input into legislation. In the United States, Republican Congressman Bill Frenzel wrote in 1995:

Presidential elections 

In a presidential system, the president is elected independently of the legislature. This may done directly through a popular vote or indirectly such as through the electoral college used in the United States. This aspect of presidential systems is sometimes touted as more democratic, as it provides a broader mandate for the president. Once elected, a president typically remains in office until the conclusion of a term.

Fixed-terms 
Presidential systems are typically understood as having a head of government elected by citizens to serve one or more fixed-terms. Fixed-terms are praised for providing a level of stability that other systems lack. Although most parliamentary governments go long periods of time without a no confidence vote, Italy, Israel, and the French Fourth Republic have all experienced difficulties maintaining stability. When parliamentary systems have multiple parties, and governments are forced to rely on coalitions, as they often do in nations that use a system of proportional representation, extremist parties can theoretically use the threat of leaving a coalition to further their agendas.

Proponents of the presidential system also argue that stability extends to the cabinets chosen under the system. In most parliamentary systems, cabinets must be drawn from within the legislative branch.  Under the presidential system, cabinet members can be selected from a much larger pool of potential candidates. This allows presidents the ability to select cabinet members based as much or more on their ability and competency to lead a particular department as on their loyalty to the president, as opposed to parliamentary cabinets, which might be filled by legislators chosen for no better reason than their perceived loyalty to the prime minister. Supporters of the presidential system note that parliamentary systems are prone to disruptive "cabinet shuffles" where legislators are moved between portfolios, whereas in presidential system cabinets (such as the United States Cabinet), cabinet shuffles are unusual.

Some political scientists dispute this concept of stability, arguing that presidential systems have difficulty sustaining democratic practices and that they have slipped into authoritarianism in many of the countries in which they have been implemented. According to political scientist Fred Riggs, presidential systems have fallen into authoritarianism in nearly every country they've been attempted. The list of the world's 22 older democracies includes only two countries (Costa Rica and the United States) with presidential systems. Yale political scientist Juan Linz argues that:

Fixed-terms in a presidential system may also be considered a check on the powers of the executive, contrasting parliamentary systems, which may allow the prime minister to call elections whenever they see fit or orchestrate their own vote of no confidence to trigger an election when they cannot get a legislative item passed. The presidential model is said to discourage this sort of opportunism, and instead forces the executive to operate within the confines of a term they cannot alter to suit their own needs.

Limited mechanisms of removal 
Unlike in parliamentary systems, the legislature does not have the power to recall a president under the presidential system. However, presidential systems may have methods to remove presidents under extraordinary circumstances, such as a president committing a crime or becoming incapacitated. In some countries, presidents are subject to term limits.

The inability to remove a president early is also the subject of criticism. Even if a president is "proved to be inefficient, even if he becomes unpopular, even if his policy is unacceptable to the majority of his countrymen, he and his methods must be endured until the moment comes for a new election".

The consistency of a presidency may be seen as beneficial during times of crisis. When in a time of crisis, countries may be better off being led by a president with a fixed term than rotating premierships. Some critics, however, argue that the presidential system is weaker because it does not allow a transfer of power in the event of an emergency. Walter Bagehot argues that the ideal ruler in times of calm is different from the ideal ruler in times of crisis, criticizing the presidential system for having no mechanism to make such a change.

Head of government as head of state 
In many cases, the president is elected as both the head of government and the head of state. This is in contrast to some parliamentary governments where the head of state separate from the head of government and plays a largely symbolic role.

The president's status is sometimes the subject of criticism. Dana D. Nelson criticizes the office of the President of the United States as essentially undemocratic and characterizes presidentialism as worship of the president by citizens, which she believes undermines civic participation. British-Irish philosopher and MP Edmund Burke stated that an official should be elected based on "his unbiased opinion, his mature judgment, his enlightened conscience", and therefore should reflect on the arguments for and against certain policies and then do what he believes is best for his constituents and country as a whole, even if it means short-term backlash. Thus defenders of presidential systems hold that sometimes what is wisest may not always be the most popular decision and vice versa.

Comparative politics 
The separation of the executive and the legislature is the key difference between a presidential system and a parliamentary system. The presidential system elects a head of government independently of the legislature, while in contrast, the head of government in a parliamentary system answers directly to the legislature. Presidential systems necessarily operate under the principle of structural separation of powers, while parliamentary systems do not; however, the degree of functional separation of powers exhibited in each varies – dualistic parliamentary systems such as the Netherlands, Sweden and Slovakia forbid members of the legislature from serving in the executive simultaneously, while Westminster-type parliamentary systems such as the United Kingdom require it. Heads of government under the presidential system don't depend on the approval of the legislature as they do in a parliamentary system (with the exception of mechanisms such as impeachment).

The presidential system and the parliamentary system can also be blended into a semi-presidential system. Under such a system, executive power is shared by an elected head of state (a president) and a legislature-appointed head of government (a prime minister or premier). The amount of power each figure holds may vary, and a semi-presidential system may lean closer to one system over the other. The president typically retains authority over foreign policy in a semi-presidential system. A pure presidential system may also have mechanisms that resemble those of a parliamentary system as part of checks and balances. The legislature may have oversight of some of the president's decisions through advice and consent, and mechanisms such as impeachment may allow the legislature to remove the president under drastic circumstances.

Subnational governments 

Subnational governments, usually states, may be structured as presidential systems. All of the state governments in the United States use the presidential system, even though this is not constitutionally required. On a local level, many cities use council-manager government, which is equivalent to a parliamentary system, although the post of a city manager is normally a non-political position. Some countries without a presidential system at the national level use a form of this system at a subnational or local level. One example is Japan, where the national government uses the parliamentary system.

Presidentialism metrics 
Presidentialism metrics allow a quantitative analysis of presidentialism for individual countries. One presidentialism metric is the presidentialism index in V-Dem Democracy indices, where higher values indicate higher concentration of political power in the hands of one individual, shown below for individual countries. Another presidentialism metric are the presidential power scores.

States with a presidential system of government 

Italics indicate states with limited recognition.

Presidential systems without a prime minister 

 

 

Nations with limited recognition are in italics.

Presidential systems with a prime minister 
The following countries have presidential systems where a post of prime minister (official title may vary) exists alongside that of the president. The president is still both the head of state and government and the prime minister's roles are mostly to assist the president. Belarus, Gabon and Kazakhstan, where the prime minister is effectively the head of government and the president the head of state, are exceptions. In the case of the United Arab Emirates, the president functions as a ruler of seven absolute monarchies.

 
  (see Chief of the Cabinet of Ministers)
 
 
 
 
 
 
 
 
 
  
 
 
 
 
 
 
 
 
 
  (as a monarchy)
 

Nations with limited recognition are in italics.

Countries with a Supreme Leader
The following country has a Supreme Leader with absolute power.

Presidential system in administrative divisions 
Dependencies of United States

 
 

Special administrative regions of China

Former presidential republics 
 (2004–2021)
 (1998–2013)
 (1990–1991, 1992–2016)
 (1975–1991)
 (1948–1991) de facto
 (1902–1959)
 (1938–1940)
 (1995–2004)
 (1930–1933) de facto
 (1973–1974)
 (1859–1957, 1957–1986)
 (1960–1963)
 (1990–1991)
 (1990–1991)
 Mali (1960–1992)
 (1960–1978)
  Niger (1960–1974, 1989–1993)
 (1958–1973,1978-1985, 2001-2002)
 (1935–1939)
/ (1991–1992) de facto
 (1963-1972)
 (1955–1975)
 (1990–1991)
 (1990–1991)
 (1995-1996)
 (1990–1991)
 (1948-1971)

See also 
 Absolute monarchy
 List of countries by system of government
 Parliamentary system
 Westminster system
 Semi-presidential system
 Coalition government

Notes

References

External links 
 The Great Debate: Parliament versus Congress
 Castagnola, Andrea/Pérez-Liñán, Aníbal: Presidential Control of High Courts in Latin America: A Long-term View (1904-2006), in Journal of Politics in Latin America, Hamburg 2009.

Republic
Political systems
System
Republicanism
Separation of powers
Types of democracy